Barbara Sarafian (born 16 April 1968) is a Belgian actress. 

In Flanders, her television debut in the much-repeated series  (Everything Can Be Better, 1998) often places her in a comic context.

She made her international debut in Peter Greenaway's 8½ Women (1999). She also appeared in Fortress 2 (2000) and in Roman Coppola's CQ (2001). She received a Best Actress award for her role as Matty in the film Collision in Moscow. In 2015 she won a Flemish Television Star for "Best actress" for her performance in the series  (In Flemish fields).

In 2016 she was the face of the campaign  (Hey how are you?) which tries to break the taboo around suicide.

Filmography

Personal life
Barbara Sarafian is of Armenian and Belgian heritage.

References

External links

1968 births
Living people
People from Ghent
Flemish actresses